Tevaughn Harriette (born 26 June 1995) is an Antigua and Barbuda international footballer who plays as a striker.

He was the United Progressive Party candidate in St Peter in the 2023 Antiguan general election.

International career
Harriette has been capped at under-17 and under-20 level. He made his senior international debut for Antigua and Barbuda with a goal on 3 September 2014 in a match against Anguilla in the Caribbean Cup.

International goals
As of match played 9 September 2019. Antigua and Barbuda score listed first, score column indicates score after each Harriette goal.

References

External links
 

Living people
1995 births
Antigua and Barbuda footballers
Antigua and Barbuda international footballers
Antigua and Barbuda under-20 international footballers
Antigua and Barbuda youth international footballers
Association football forwards
Parham F.C. players
2014 Caribbean Cup players

United Progressive Party (Antigua and Barbuda) politicians